John Ludlow (fl. 1395) of Oxford was an English Member of Parliament for Oxford in 1395.

References

14th-century births
Year of death missing
14th-century English people
People from Oxford
English MPs 1395